Eumastacidae are a family of grasshoppers sometimes known as monkey- or matchstick grasshoppers. They usually have thin legs that are held folded at right angles to the body, sometimes close to the horizontal plane. Many species are wingless and the head is at an angle with the top of the head often jutting above the line of the thorax and abdomen. They have three segmented tarsi and have a short antenna with a knobby organ at the tip. They do not have a prosternal spine or tympanum. Most species are tropical and the diversity is greater in the Old World. They are considered primitive within the Orthoptera and feed on algae, ferns and gymnosperms, the more ancient plant groups.

The families Chorotypidae and Morabidae were formerly included in this group as subfamilies but are now considered as families within the Eumastacoidea. With the exception of the central Asian Gomphomastacinae, all other subfamilies are restricted to South America.

Subfamilies and Genera
The Orthoptera Species File lists the following:

Eumastacinae
Auth.: Burr, 1899 - central and south America
 Amedegnatomastax Cadena-Castañeda & Cardona, 2015
 Andeomastax Descamps, 1979
 Araguamastax Descamps, 1982
 Beomastax Descamps, 1979
 Caenomastax Hebard, 1923
 Cardonamastax Cadena-Castañeda, 2015
 Descampsmastax Cadena-Castañeda & Cardona, 2015
 Erythromastax Descamps, 1971
 Eumastax Burr, 1899
 Hebardomastax Cadena-Castañeda, 2016
 Helicomastax Rowell & Bentos-Pereira, 2001
 Homeomastax Descamps, 1979
 Hysteromastax Descamps, 1979
 Phryganomastax Descamps, 1982
 Santanderia Hebard, 1923
 Sciaphilomastax Descamps, 1979
 Zeromastax Porras, 2007

Gomphomastacinae
Auth.: Burr, 1899 - India, central and north-eastern Asia
 Afghanomastax Descamps, 1974
 Brachymastax Ramme, 1939
 Clinomastax Bei-Bienko, 1949
 Gomphomastax Brunner von Wattenwyl, 1898
 Gyabus Özdikmen, 2008
 Myrmeleomastax Yin, 1984
 Nepalomastax Yamasaki, 1983
 Oreomastax Bei-Bienko, 1949
 Paedomastax Bolívar, 1930
 Pentaspinula Yin, 1982
 Phytomastax Bei-Bienko, 1949
 Ptygomastax Bei-Bienko, 1959
 Sinomastax Yin, 1984

Subfamilies M
Masynteinae
Auth.: Descamps, 1973 - Cuba
 Masyntes Karsch, 1889
Morseinae 
Auth.: Rehn, 1948 - Americas
 tribe Daguerreacridini Descamps, 1973
 Daguerreacris Descamps & Liebermann, 1970
 tribe Morseini Rehn, 1948
 Eumorsea Hebard, 1935
 Morsea Scudder, 1898
 tribe Psychomastacini Descamps, 1973
 Psychomastax Rehn & Hebard, 1918

Subfamilies P
Paramastacinae 
Auth.: Rehn & Grant Jr., 1958 - south America
 Paramastax Burr, 1899
Parepisactinae 
Auth.: Descamps, 1971 - south America
 Chapadamastax Descamps, 1979
 Parepisactus Giglio-Tos, 1898
Pseudomastacinae 
Auth.: Rehn & Grant Jr., 1958 - south America
 Pseudomastax Bolívar, 1914

Temnomastacinae
Auth.: Rehn & Grant Jr., 1958 - south America
 tribe Eumastacopini Descamps, 1973 
 Arawakella Rehn & Rehn, 1942
 Bahiamastax Descamps, 1979
 Eumastacops Rehn & Rehn, 1942
 Maripa Descamps & Amédégnato, 1970
 Pareumastacops Descamps, 1979
 Pseudeumastacops Descamps, 1974
 Tachiramastax Descamps, 1974
 tribe Temnomastacini Rehn & Grant, 1958
 Eutemnomastax Descamps, 1979
 Temnomastax Rehn & Rehn, 1942

Incertae sedis
 Acutacris Dirsh, 1965 - Madagascar
 Angulomastax Zheng, 1985 - central Asia
 †Archaeomastax Sharov, 1968
 †Taphacris Cockerell, 1926

References

 
Orthoptera families